East Glacier Park station is a train station in East Glacier Park Village, Montana. It is a seasonal stop for Amtrak's Empire Builder line, open from April to October. It serves mostly visitors to Glacier National Park. It functions as an alternate to Browning station on the Blackfeet Indian Reservation, which opens from October to April.

The historic Glacier Park Lodge was built in 1913 by the Great Northern Railroad. The hotel is within a block's distance from the station, and thus arriving passengers can walk to the Glacier Park Hotel if they wish, but typically a van from the hotel meets the train and will carry passengers and their luggage to the hotel. The station, platform, and parking are owned by BNSF Railway. This station operates during the summer only.

The station has a sign that reads Glacier Park (its historic former name), but the current "East Glacier Park" name is used on Amtrak schedules and by train personnel when making the onboard arrival announcement.

Notes and references

External links 

 East Glacier Park station – USA Rail Guide (Train Web)

Amtrak stations in Montana
Railway stations in the United States opened in 1913
Buildings and structures in Glacier County, Montana
Transportation in Glacier County, Montana
Glacier Park
1913 establishments in Montana